Dario Poggi (13 May 1909 – 9 December 1977) was an Italian bobsledder who competed from the late 1930s to the 1940s. Competing in two Winter Olympics, he earned his best finish of sixth in the two-man event at St. Moritz in 1948.

References

External links
 
1936 bobsleigh two-man results
1948 bobsleigh two-man results
Bobsleigh two-man results: 1932-56 and since 1964 
1936 Olympic Winter Games official report. - p. 418.
Dario Poggi's profile at Sports Reference.com

Olympic bobsledders of Italy
Bobsledders at the 1936 Winter Olympics
Bobsledders at the 1948 Winter Olympics
Bobsledders at the 1952 Winter Olympics
Italian male bobsledders
1977 deaths
1909 births